Household goods are goods and products used within households.  They are the tangible and movable personal property placed in the rooms of a house, such as a bed or refrigerator.

Economic role
Businesses that produce household goods are categorized as Cyclical Consumer Products by the Thomson Reuters Business Classification and are organized into three sub-categories:
Consumer Electronics,
Appliances, tools and housewares
Home Furnishings (such as furniture)

Household goods are a significant part of a country's economy, with their purchase the topic of magazines such as Consumer Reports, their relocation handled by moving companies, and their disposal or redistribution facilitated by companies like Goodwill Industries, services like classified advertising and Craigslist, and events such as garage sales and car boot sales.

Their safety is often regulated by governments, which also promote and facilitate their import and export.

See also
Durable goods
Homeart
Fast-moving consumer goods

References

External links
Household Products Database

Manufactured goods
Family economics